The following is the qualification system and qualified countries for the Shooting at the 2023 Pan American Games competitions.

Qualification system
A total of 244 sport shooters will qualify to compete. Each nation may enter a maximum of 24 athletes (two per each individual event). Therefore, a nation can enter 12 (6 per gender) in each discipline (rifle, pistol and shotgun). There will be three qualification events for shooters to qualify. There will be no quotas awarded for the mixed events, as nations must use already qualified athletes to compete in them. As host nation, Chile will get a quota of six athletes (two per each discipline, and can qualify more) and there will also be two wild cards awarded to nations not qualified.

All quotas will be awarded in sequential order of the event in question and an athlete may only win one quota for a country. A nation may substitute quotas from one event to another as along its within the same discipline (rifle, pistol and shotgun). This means the qualification of quotas will not necessarily reflect the final entry lists.

Qualification timeline

Quota allocation
There will be 70 quotas available in each rifle and pistol along with 92 in shotgun events. Chile's 6 host quota spots will be awarded two per discipline. They are split as follows:

Qualification summary by event

No quotas for the mixed doubles events of Rifle, Pistol and Skeet will be granted; athletes who have qualified for individual events must be used to enter the Mixed Doubles event. 
AR = Air rifle, R3P = Rifle three positions, AP = Air pistol, RFP = Rapid fire pistol, P = Pistol

Qualification summary per discipline

Men

Pistol events
The quota allocation is as follows:

Rifle events
The quota allocation is as follows:

Shotgun events
The quota allocation is as follows:

Two spots in skeet will be reallocated as there was not enough athletes to allocate the full quota of 28 at the Pan American Championships.

Women

Pistol events
The quota allocation is as follows:

Rifle events
The quota allocation is as follows:

Shotgun events
The quota allocation is as follows:

One spot in skeet will be reallocated as there was not enough athletes to allocate the full quota of 12 at the Pan American Championships.

References

P
P
Qualification for the 2023 Pan American Games